Michael Gauci (born 19 August 1950) is a Maltese sports shooter. He competed in the mixed trap event at the 1984 Summer Olympics.

References

1950 births
Living people
Maltese male sport shooters
Olympic shooters of Malta
Shooters at the 1984 Summer Olympics
Place of birth missing (living people)